Frederick John Smallbone (born 22 January 1948) is a British rower who competed in the 1972 Summer Olympics and in the 1976 Summer Olympics.

Rowing career
Smallbone won the coxless fours with Jim Clark, Bill Mason and Lenny Robertson, rowing for the Thames Tradesmen's Rowing Club, at the inaugural 1972 National Rowing Championships. Later in 1972 the same crew was selected for Great Britain at the 1972 Summer Olympics where they just failed to reach the final, finishing in fourth place in the semi finals of the men's coxless four.

In 1974 he was part of an eight that won Great Britain's silver medal at the 1974 World Rowing Championships and the following year he won the coxless pairs with Glyn Locke, rowing for the a Leander and Thames Tradesmen's composite, at the 1975 National Rowing Championships. The following year he won the silver medal with the British boat in the eights competition at the 1976 Summer Olympics.

References

External links
 

1948 births
Living people
British male rowers
Olympic rowers of Great Britain
Rowers at the 1972 Summer Olympics
Rowers at the 1976 Summer Olympics
Olympic silver medallists for Great Britain
Stewards of Henley Royal Regatta
Olympic medalists in rowing
World Rowing Championships medalists for Great Britain
Medalists at the 1976 Summer Olympics